Veronica bullii is a species of flowering plant in the plantain family known by the common names kittentails and Bull's coraldrops. It is native to the Upper Midwest of the United States, including the states of Ohio, Indiana, Illinois, Wisconsin, Iowa, and Minnesota.

Description
Veronica bullii forms a low-lying rosette of basal leaves that large, covered with pubescent hairs, and many veined. The yellowish flowers are arranged into a dense cylindrical spike. The stem leaves are greatly reduced, arranged alternately, and also partly clasp around the stems. The flowers are sessile and the lower lip of each flower corolla has three lobes. Two long stamens protrude past the corolla lobes. Flowering occurs in April through June and the flowering stems remain after flowering until the end of summer.

Habitat
Veronica bullii is limited to specific habitats, preferring gravelly soils in prairies, grasslands, savannas, and woodlands.

Distribution
Veronica bullii is endemic to the Midwestern region of the USA where it is rare or endangered over its entire range and likely extinct in Ohio. It occurring in Indiana, Illinois, Wisconsin, Iowa, and Minnesota.

References

External links
USDA Plants Profile

bullii